The World Military Track & Field Championships are the world championships of athletics organized by the International Military Sports Council (CISM). Initially an annual competition, the championships have been held on an irregular schedule since 1971. The 2011 Championships was the 44th edition.

The 37th (1995), 38th (1999), 41st (2003), 42nd (2007) and 44th (2011) editions coincided with the first five editions of the Summer Military World Games.

In addition to this outdoor competition, a World Military Indoor Athletics Cup was staged in 2009 in Athens.

Editions
From 2011 the track and field world championships are the track and field competitions of the Military World Games.

See also
Inter-Allied Games
World Military Championships
Military World Games
World Military Cross Country Championships

References

External links
Page of the Track & Field Championships from official site of CISM

 
Athletics
Military
Recurring sporting events established in 1951